Joseph Aloysius Burke (August 27, 1886 – October 16, 1962) was an American prelate of the Roman Catholic Church who served as bishop of the Diocese of Buffalo, New York from 1952 until his death in 1962.

Biography

Early life 
Joseph Burke was born in Buffalo, New York, to Joseph S. and Amelia (née Howard) Burke. The son of a boilermaker, he wanted to enter the priesthood since the age of six. He attended Canisius High School and Canisius College, both in his native city. He made his theological studies at the University of Innsbruck in Austria.

Priesthood 
Returning to Buffalo, Burke was ordained a priest by Bishop Charles H. Colton on August 3, 1912. During World War I, Burke was attached as an Army chaplain to the 91st Division of the US Army on the Belgian front. After the war, he served as a curate and pastor in the Diocese of Buffalo, and as a teacher at Mount Carmel Guild and at D'Youville College in Buffalo.

Auxiliary Bishop and Bishop of Buffalo 
On April 20, 1943, Burke was appointed titular bishop of Vita and the first auxiliary bishop of Buffalo by Pope Pius XII. He received his episcopal consecration on June 29, 1943, from Archbishop Amleto Cicognani, with Archbishop Thomas Walsh and Bishop Edmund Gibbons serving as co-consecrators. He selected as his episcopal motto, "Let Your Will Be Done". Following the death of Bishop John A. Duffy in September 1944, Burke served as apostolic administrator of the diocese until the appointment of Bishop John O'Hara in March 1945.

When O'Hara was later promoted to Archbishop of Philadelphia, Burke was named to succeed him as the ninth bishop of Buffalo on February 9, 1952. He was the first native son of the diocese to become its bishop. His installation took place on April 30, 1952. During his 10-year-long administration, Burke gave his support to various groups, including the Holy Name Society, missions, the Pre-Cana program, Puerto Rican migrants, and displaced persons. He also continued the expansion and construction of educational institutions, including St. John Vianney Seminary in East Aurora, New York. He was made an assistant at the pontifical throne in 1956, and a commander of the Order of Merit of the Italian Republic in 1960.

Death and legacy 
At age 76, Joseph Burke died in Rome on October 16, 1962, during the first week of the Second Vatican Council. His death was the first among the bishops attending the Council. He was buried in the chapel of Christ the King Seminary in East Aurora. His body was moved to St. Joseph Cathedral after the seminary was closed in 2020.

References

1962 deaths
Canisius College alumni
Participants in the Second Vatican Council
University of Innsbruck alumni
1886 births
Roman Catholic bishops of Buffalo
World War I chaplains
United States Army chaplains
D'Youville College faculty
20th-century Roman Catholic bishops in the United States